The Phoenix Iron Works (1855: Phoenix Iron Company; 1949: Phoenix Iron & Steel Company; 1955: Phoenix Steel Corporation), located in  Phoenixville, Pennsylvania, was a manufacturer of iron and related products during the 19th century and early 20th century. Phoenix Iron Company was a major producer of cannon for the Union Army during the American Civil War.  The company also produced the Phoenix column, an advance in construction material.  Company facilities are a core component of the Phoenixville Historic District, a National Register of Historic Places site that was in 2006 recognized as a historic landmark by ASM International.

History 
Founded in 1790 to produce nails and purchased in 1812 by New Jersey industrialist Robert Waln, the Phoenix Iron Company (later renamed the Phoenix Iron Works) produced pig iron, wrought iron, and other iron-related materials and end products. As the complex grew, it featured a huge blast furnace and puddling furnace, an adjacent iron foundry, warehouses, ancillary buildings, and associated equipment. In 1825, the company was the first to generate steam by burning anthracite coal. Other innovations followed. Engineers at the foundry invented a power-driven rolling method to weld and forge wrought iron, a process that enabled the iron company to begin producing cannon for the United States Army.

In the late 20th century, the company declined along with the steel and iron industry of Pennsylvania.  By 1984, production in Phoenixville had ceased. In 1986, the new management of the renamed Phoenix Steel Corporation announced plans to close its remaining production plants in Claymont, Delaware. The following year, the rolling mill closed, all production of steel ceased, Phoenix made its last shipment of steel, and its remaining production and maintenance employees were laid off. Throughout 1987, a number of investors approached Phoenix about acquiring the Claymont mill, and in 1988, Phoenix sold it to CITIC, a state-owned investment company of the People's Republic of China for $13 million. A new corporation, CitiSteel, was formed to operate the facility. CitiSteel refurbished and modernized the plant, spending $25 million to convert Claymont from a "specialty mill" that produced various low-volume, high-cost steels for specific uses to a "minimill" using technologically advanced equipment to mass-produce a few types of steel at high volume and low cost.

In 1998, the Phoenixville Area Economic Development Corporation (PAEDCO) took ownership of the building. Under the guidance of the National Park Service, PAEDCO undertook exterior renovations and constructed the Schuylkill River Heritage Center which occupies 1,600 sq.ft. of the historic Foundry Building.  The museum tells the story of the Phoenix Iron & Steel Company and also provides information about the industrial legacy of the Schuylkill River.(www.phoenixvillefoundry.org) The Hankin Group acquired the Phoenix Foundry property from PAEDCO in 2006 to create an  event space.

, the Phoenix Steel site is empty. Most of its buildings were dismantled. Only the old foundry and company office buildings remain from the once-sprawling complex; both have been restored and put to other uses.

Products 

Besides the Griffen Gun and the Phoenix Column, the company produced iron for rails for the Pennsylvania Railroad and other eastern railroad lines, wrought iron for fencing and home decorative usage, and similar applications, as well as steel products.  The Eiffel Tower in Paris used puddled iron from Phoenixville.

Griffen Gun 
In 1855 John Griffen Jr. (1812-1884) developed the famous Griffen Gun while he was at the Safe Harbor Iron Works, a large rolling mill, located in Safe Harbor, Lancaster County, Pennsylvania) and was operated by the firm Reeves, Abbott & Co. of Philadelphia, Pennsylvania. In 1855, the Phoenix Iron Works (Phoenixville, Pennsylvania) foundry began producing six-pounder smoothbore artillery pieces known as Griffen Guns, after inventor John Griffen Jr. (1812-1884). Hundreds were turned out before production shifted in 1861 to other Griffen designs. Company owner Daniel Reeves spent much money on equipment and processes to modernize the factory and make it one of America's leading producers of iron and steel.

During the Civil War, the factory manufactured over 1,000 Griffen-designed 3-inch Ordnance rifles, the lion's share of the more than 1,400 similar guns eventually bought by the Army (see Field Artillery in the American Civil War). Produced by the company's unique rolling process, the  wrought iron barrels were durable and resisted bursting, unlike the cast iron gun tubes of Phoenixville's smaller competitors. At its peak, the factory was producing fifty rifles a week.

Many of these rifled guns are in private collections, municipal parks, and at battlefields across the country, including the Gettysburg Battlefield. They are distinguished by the letters PIC (for Phoenix Iron Company) stamped on the muzzle.

Phoenix column 
The Phoenix Column, patented by Samuel Reeves in 1862, was a hollow cylinder composed of four, six, or eight wrought iron segments riveted together. The resulting column was much lighter and stronger than the solid cast iron columns of the day. They allowed the construction of massive structures without brutally heavy load-bearing walls. Taller and taller buildings could now be built on narrow urban plots, helping facilitate the creation of the skyscraper and high-stress-load-bearing bridges.

Phoenix Bridge Company 
The success of the Phoenix column led to the formation of a construction subsidiary named Clarke, Reeves & Co. Later renamed the Phoenixville Bridge Works and finally the Phoenix Bridge Company,  the firm ultimately built some 4,200 bridges, primarily wrought iron truss railway bridges.  Phoenix Bridge helped build the Manhattan Bridge, the Walnut Street Bridge in Harrisburg, Pennsylvania, and the Calhoun Street Bridge, between Trenton, New Jersey, and Morrisville, Pennsylvania, and projects as far away as Chile, Russia and China.  In 1900, the Bridge Company was awarded the contract for the Quebec Bridge across the St. Lawrence River, which collapsed in 1907. Despite the blow to its reputation, Phoenix Bridge lived on for another half-century, ultimately closing in 1962.  A number of the company's works are listed on the U.S. National Register of Historic Places.

Works include:
Boston University Bridge, between Cambridge, Massachusetts and Boston, Massachusetts built in 1927.
Bridge in West Fallowfield Township, Ross Fording Road over Octoraro Creek, near Steelville, West Fallowfield Township, Pennsylvania, NRHP-listed
Bridge in Upper Frederick Township, Fagleysville Rd. over Swamp Creek, Fagleysville, Pennsylvania (Phoenix Bridge Co.), NRHP-listed
Brocton Arch, jct. of Main St. with Lake and Highland Aves., Brocton, New York (Phoenix Bridge Co.), NRHP-listed
County Line Bowstring, over West Creek, Northwest of Hollis, Hollis, Kansas, and Wayne, Kansas (Phoenix Bridge Co.), NRHP-listed
Etters Bridge, Green Lane Dr. and Yellow Breeches Creek, Fairview Township, Pennsylvania, and Lower Allen Township, Pennsylvania (Phoenix Bridge Co.), NRHP-listed
Phoenix Bridge, Northwest of Eagle Rock off Virginia 615 over Craig Creek, Eagle Rock, Virginia (Phoenix Bridge Co.), NRHP-listed
Trenton City/Calhoun Street Bridge, spans Delaware River between Morrisville, Pennsylvania, and Trenton, New Jersey (Phoenix Bridge Co.), NRHP-listed
Mill City Oregon Railroad Bridge, now a pedestrian bridge.  A Phoenix Column bridge, manufactured  in 1888, moved to San Jose, CA then  Lake Oswego Oregon then to Mill City Oregon, Installed 1919. Abandoned by Southern Pacific railroad around 1967 and used as a pedestrian and bike bridge. Current restoration being undertaken by  'Save our Bridge"
Dingman's Ferry Bridge, in Dingman Township, Pennsylvania and Sandyston Township, New Jersey was built in 1900 using Phoenix columns and other steel from another Phoenix bridge 
Works in Brazil:
Complexo FEPASA, in Jundiaí, São Paulo, Brazil. The railway workshop shed structure was bought in 1890.
Recife's Bridge at Capibaribe river, was built in 1884.

Gallery

See also 
 Hayden Bridge (Springfield, Oregon)

Notes

References 
 Lemelson Center for the Study of Invention & Innovation, Smithsonian National Museum of American History
 Cole, Philip, The 3" Ordnance Rifle, CHARGE! magazine, Issue 13, 2006.
 Hazlett, James C.; Olmstead, Edwin; and Parks, M. Hume; Field Artillery Weapons of the Civil War. University of Illinois Press, 2004. .
 Martino, Vincent Jr.; Phoenixville. Arcadia Publishing, 2002. .

External links

Phoenix Bridge Company projects on Structurae
Album of designs of the Phoenixville Bridge-Works / by Clarke, Reeves & Co., 1873 
Album of designs of the Phoenix Bridge Company : successors to Clarke, Reeves & Co., Phoenixville Bridge Works., 1885

Companies based in Chester County, Pennsylvania
Pennsylvania in the American Civil War
American companies established in 1790
History of science and technology in the United States
Bridge companies
Historic American Engineering Record in Pennsylvania
1790 establishments in Pennsylvania
Construction and civil engineering companies of the United States
1812 establishments in Pennsylvania
Construction and civil engineering companies established in 1812
American companies established in 1812
Manufacturing companies established in 1790
Defunct manufacturing companies based in Pennsylvania